The Panda Hydrogen is a prototype fuel cell-type hydrogen vehicle based on the Fiat Panda introduced in 2006.

The fuel, gaseous Hydrogen, is stored in underfloor hydrogen tanks at 350 bar. A Nuvera Fuel Cells "Andromeda II" fuel cell stack generates energy to power an electric motor directly, i.e. without a battery.

History 

In 2001 was introduced first version of Fiats's fuel cell type vehicle Seicento Elettra H2 Fuel Cell, after that came Seicento Hydrogen.

See also

 List of fuel cell vehicles

External links
 Fiat Panda Hydrogen Information

Hydrogen cars
Fuel cell vehicles
Panda Hydrogen